Brescia is a city in Italy.

Brescia may also refer to:

 Brescia (surname)

Italy
 Province of Brescia
 Brescia Calcio, a football club
 AN Brescia, a water-sports club
 University of Brescia
 Brescia Arsenal, a small arms factory

North America
 Brescia University, in Owensboro, Kentucky, U.S.
 Brescia University College, in London, Ontario, Canada